The Journal of Human Reproductive Sciences is a peer-reviewed open-access medical journal published on behalf of the Indian Society of Assisted Reproduction. The journal publishes articles on the subject of assisted conception, endocrinology, physiology and pathology, implantation, and preimplantation genetic diagnosis.

Abstracting and indexing 
The journal is indexed with Abstracts on Hygiene and Communicable Diseases, CAB Abstracts, EBSCO databases, Excerpta Medica/EMBASE, and PubMedCentral.

See also
Human Reproduction (journal)

External links 
 

Open access journals
English-language journals
Triannual journals
Publications established in 2008
Medknow Publications academic journals
Obstetrics and gynaecology journals
Academic journals associated with learned and professional societies